The Gallant Hours is an American docudrama from 1960 about William F. Halsey, Jr. and his efforts in fighting against Admiral Isoroku Yamamoto and the Imperial Japanese Navy in the Guadalcanal campaign of World War II.

This film was directed by Robert Montgomery, who also did uncredited narration, and it stars James Cagney as Admiral Halsey. Featured in the cast are Dennis Weaver, Ward Costello, Vaughn Taylor, Richard Jaeckel, and Les Tremayne. The screenplay was by Frank D. Gilroy and Beirne Lay, Jr., and the unusual a cappella choral score was composed and conducted by Roger Wagner, although the theme song was written by Ward Costello.

The film was produced by Montgomery and Cagney, and it was the only film made by their joint production company. It was also Cagney's last starring role in a dramatic film.  The Gallant Hours was released by the United Artists company on June 22, 1960.

Description
The film starts and ends with these words from the score's song performed by the Roger Wagner Chorale group, which sums up the story of the film.  "Away He Went" is the name of the song:

I knew a lad who went to sea and left the shore behind him;
I knew him well; the lad was me and now I cannot find him.
– from the opening chorale

The Gallant Hours depicts the crucial five-week period in October–November 1942 after Admiral Halsey (James Cagney) took command of the beleaguered American forces in the South Pacific Area. That period of combat became a turning point in the struggle against the Japanese Empire during the World War II. The story is told in flashback, framed by Halsey's ceremony of going on inactive duty in 1947. (Note that officers of five-star rank never retire. American five-star rank is a lifetime appointment with full pay and benefits.)

Unusual for a war film, The Gallant Hours has no battle scenes. All the fighting takes place off-screen, and there is an emphasis throughout the film on logistics and strategy rather than the tactics and combat. Fundamentally, the film becomes a battle of wills and wits between the dogged Halsey and his brilliant Japanese counterpart, Admiral Yamamoto (James T. Goto, who was also Technical Advisor for the film). For dramatic effect, the secret mission to kill Yamamoto is made contemporaneous with the Naval Battle of Guadalcanal. In fact, Yamamoto was killed over Bougainville five months later in April 1943.

Also somewhat unorthodox is that scenes depicting Japanese staff officers were performed in Japanese, with only summary translations provided by the narrator. This narration was remarkably evenhanded in its characterization of the enemy for an American feature film of this period.

The film's coda is a quote from Admiral Halsey:

"There are no great men, only great challenges that ordinary men are forced by circumstances to meet."

Cast

 James Cagney as William F. Halsey Jr.
 Dennis Weaver as Lieutenant Commander Andrew Jefferson "Andy" Lowe III, USN
 Ward Costello as Captain Harry Black, USN
 Vaughn Taylor as Commander Mike Pulaski, USN
 Richard Jaeckel as Lieutenant Commander Roy Webb, USN
 Les Tremayne as Captain Frank Enright, USN
 Walter Sande as Captain Horace Keys, USN
 Karl Swenson as Captain Bill Bailey, USN
 Leon Lontoc as Chief Petty Officer Salvador Jesus Maravilla, USN
 Robert Burton (actor) as Maj. Gen. Roy Geiger, USMC
 Carleton Young as Colonel Evans Carlson, USMC
 Raymond Bailey as Major General Archie Vandegrift, USMC
 Harry Landers as Captain Joseph "Joe" Foss, USMC
 Richard Carlyle as Father Frederic Gehring
 James Yagi as Rear Admiral Jiro Kobe, IJN
 James T. Goto as Admiral Isoroku Yamamoto, IJN
 Carl Benton Reid as Vice-Admiral Robert Ghormley, USN
 Nelson Leigh as Rear Admiral Dan Callaghan, USN (uncredited)
 Sydney Smith as Rear Admiral Norm Scott, USN (uncredited)
 William Schallert as Captain Thomas G. "Tom" Lanphier Jr., USAAF (uncredited)
 John Zaremba as Major General Hubert R. Harmon, USAAF (uncredited)
 Herbert Lytton as Admiral George Murray, USN (uncredited)
 John McKee as Lieutenant Harrison Ludlam, USN (uncredited)
 Tyler McVey as Admiral Ernest J. King, USN (uncredited)
 Selmer Jackson as Admiral Chester Nimitz, USN (uncredited)
 Stuart Randall as Rear Admiral Kelly Turner (uncredited)
 Maggie Magennis as Red Cross Nurse Young (uncredited)
 Art Gilmore as the narrator (Japanese sequences)
 Robert Montgomery as the narrator (American sequences, uncredited)

Casting
 The sons of the film's two principals, James Cagney, Jr., and Robert Montgomery, Jr., both appear in the film, uncredited, as U.S. Marines. For Cagney, this was his only film appearance, whereas Montgomery appeared in four other films and a half-dozen television episodes.

Production

Director Robert Montgomery had served under Admiral William F. Halsey, Jr., as a Commander in the U.S. Navy during World War II, and he came up with the idea of making a film about Halsey when he attended the 75th birthday celebration honoring the Admiral in 1957. Montgomery and his good friend James Cagney acquired the rights to Halsey's life story later that year, and they formed a production company, Cagney-Montgomery Productions, to make the film. Montgomery had started directing on 1945's They Were Expendable, substituting for John Ford when Ford was ill, and made his credited directorial debut in 1947 with Lady in the Lake. He had also produced for television before, but The Gallant Hours was the first feature film he both directed and produced. It turned out to be his last involvement of any kind in film and television as a producer, director, or actor. Cagney's foray into production was also his first, and his last.

Under his contract agreement with Cagney-Montgomery Productions, Admiral Halsey would receive 10 percent of the profits from the motion picture. During a visit with his son, William F. Halsey III, in La Jolla, California, Admiral Halsey went to Camp Pendleton where The Gallant Hours was being filmed (pictured).  William F. Halsey III later remarked that he was startled at how much James Cagney looked like his father did during World War II.

The voiceover narration technique Montgomery utilized was similar to what he had done in Lady in the Lake, although in that case the narration was in the first person. What is striking about the narrative in The Gallant Hours is the degree of detail provided to introduce both main and minor characters to the audience, even sometimes indicating the manner of their death in the near future.  Also unusual is that both American and Japanese characters are treated in a neutral and evenhanded way. The production team utilized the services of three technical advisors in making the film – Captain Joseph U. Lademan, Captain Idris Monahan, and James T. Goto, who not only was the Japanese advisor but also portrayed Admiral Yamamoto in the film.

For James Cagney, The Gallant Hours was "a labor of love, a tribute to that wonderful man Admiral William F. 'Bull' Halsey" for himself and his long-time friend Robert Montgomery. Cagney praised Montgomery because he "steered away from big battle scenes and roaring guns.  We concentrated on Halsey himself, trying to convey some of the tension of high command" in the film.  In researching his role as Halsey, Cagney interviewed many men who had served under the Admiral, including two interviews with the admiral himself, but he found the role a difficult one, despite the physical similarities between the two men. Cagney was very concerned that he not impose any of his usual acting mannerisms on the character of Halsey – on the other hand, despite having met his subject several times, he didn't try to imitate Halsey's mannerisms either. As Cagney biographer John McCabe noted: "The film would be utterly boring without Cagney's thoughtful performance. Nowhere in his career had he been called on to do so much by doing so little."  The Gallant Hours was Cagney's last starring role in a dramatic film.  Thereafter he starred in a comedy, One, Two, Three, in 1961, and appeared briefly in Ragtime in 1981.

The Gallant Hours was filmed in black & white at Metro-Goldwyn-Mayer Studios in the spring of 1959, with some exterior scenes shot in San Diego. The film employed a new construction technique to make the interior battleship shots easier to light: the sets were hung from overhead grids to enable them to swing in and out as needed.  Working titles for the film were "Bull Halsey" and "The Admiral Halsey Story". The studio rented a Sikorsky VS-44A, N41881, named "Mother Goose", from Catalina Air Lines, Inc., and painted it in wartime camouflage to depict a secret flight that Halsey had made to the South Pacific in a Consolidated PB2Y-1 Coronado. Although the studio had promised to repaint the flying boat after the production, this did not happen, and the airline had to restore the civilian livery itself.

It had its world premiere in Washington, D.C. on 13 May 1960, sponsored by the Navy League, and was released generally on 22 June 1960 in New York City.

Reception
Although not a major box-office success, The Gallant Hours was well received by film critics, with Bosley Crowther writing in his review for The New York Times:

Beirne Lay Jr. and Frank D. Gilroy have written a screen play so fully packed with biographical and historical data on Admiral Halsey and his opposite number in the Japanese fleet—and likewise so loaded with characters whose names ring heroic bells—that anyone at all interested in the haunting record of the early days of the war in the South Pacific must see this film.

Even though Mr. Montgomery has bravely put it upon the screen in a calm, unhurried fashion that belies the usual slambang of war, and may very well irritate the patron who is looking for more explosive things, it comes out in his adroit direction as drama of intense restraint and power.

But more than a documentation, more than a drama of what went on within the cabin of Admiral Halsey in one of the most perilous phases of the war, this film is a brilliant tribute to the gallantry of the admiral himself, thanks in large measure to the performance of James Cagney in the role.

Crowther also singled out Dennis Weaver, Ward Costello, and James T. Goto for their performances.  Biographer John McCabe also praised Cagney's portrayal:

There are few actors who can make nonvocal thought meaningful and interesting.  Cagney does so by the great actor's technique of actually thinking the necessary thoughts and letting them register naturally and unaffectedly on his features, opening himself up to these thoughts and these alone.  Toward the end of The Gallant Hours, when he is increasingly alone in his command center, his acting becomes almost pure thought.

TV Guide gave The Gallant Hours a three-star rating, noting: "James Cagney was the perfect choice to play Admiral Halsey."  It also praised Robert Montgomery's direction that "focuses on the human side of the war, taking the time to show the inner workings of a great leader. The going is a little slow for what was thought to be a 'war' movie, but it is this leisurely pace that makes the film all the more believable." In her 2019 film history book World War II at the Movies, author Virginia Lyman Lucas called The Gallant Hours a "wonderfully informative, authentic semidocumentatary film" that was "chock-full of facts, logistics, and strategies and is sparse in combat action" but "fascinating and mesmerizing mostly due to the magnificent portrayal of Admiral Halsey by James Cagney."

Historical accuracy and inaccuracies

The producers went to great lengths to interview staff members who had worked with Admiral Halsey during World War II, including two interviews with the admiral himself by James Cagney, during the preproduction research for The Gallant Hours. Cagney's dignified portrayal may have softened Halsey's often salty, pugnacious personality. For example, when he received his orders to assume command of the South Pacific forces, Admiral Halsey's response was: "Jesus Christ and General Jackson! This is the hottest potato they ever handed me!"

The action of the film takes place over a five-week period, between 8 October 1942 and 1 December 1942. However, the death of Admiral Yamamoto occurred on 18 April 1943, some five months after the film's time period. The Gallant Hours also shows U.S. Marine aviators flying F6F Hellcat fighter planes, which were not in service during the Guadalcanal campaign.   The wingtip fuel tanks visible on these aircraft were a postwar modification for the F6F-5K drone.  The orange drone paint scheme is also evident.

Legacy

The oil portrait of Cagney that hangs in New York City's Players Club, of which he was a member, depicts him as Halsey in this film.

See also
 List of American films of 1960
 Guadalcanal Campaign (7 August 1942 – 7 February 1943)
 Battle of the Santa Cruz Islands (25–27 October 1942)
 Naval Battle of Guadalcanal (12–15 November 1942)
 Death of Isoroku Yamamoto (18 April 1943)

Home video
The Gallant Hours was released on VHS in 1992, but not on laserdisc.  A DVD version is available. Kino has released a Blu-ray version.

References

Notes

Bibliography
 James Cagney. Cagney on Cagney (New York: Doubleday  Company, Inc., 1976) 
 Homer Dickens. The Complete Films of James Cagney (Secaucus, New Jersey: Citadel Press, 1972) 2nd rev. edition (1989) 
 John McCabe. Cagney (New York:  Alfred A.Knopf, Inc., 1997) 
 Lawrence H. Suid. Sailing the Silver Screen: Hollywood and the U.S. Navy (Annapolis, Maryland: Naval Institute Press, 1996) 
 Box: 20, Fold: 7 - The Gallant Hours, 1959-1960 - Department of Defense Film Collection, Georgetown University

External links
 
 
 
 
 
 
 The New York Times review from when film was originally released
 

1960 films
1960s English-language films
1960 war films
American war films
American biographical films
American docudrama films
Films directed by Robert Montgomery (actor)
World War II films based on actual events
Pacific War films
Films set in 1942
World War II aviation films
Films about the United States Navy in World War II
United Artists films
Cultural depictions of Isoroku Yamamoto
1960s American films